Ichneutica sistens is a moth of the family Noctuidae. This species is endemic to New Zealand. It can be found in the central North Island and throughout the South Island, although it is more common on the eastern side of that latter Island. It is very variable in both colour and size. I. sistens prefers open habitat such as tussock grasslands, dunes and braided rivers. Larval host species include grasses in the family Poaceae and include species in the genera Rytidosperma and Elymus, as well as Poa cita and Agrostis capillaris. Adults are on the wing from January to May and are attracted to light.

Taxonomy 
This species was originally described by Achille Guenée in 1868 using specimens collected by Richard William Fereday in the Canterbury region and named Eumichtis sistens. The lectotype specimen is presumed by Robert Hoare to have been collected at Rakaia. The lectotype specimen is held at the Natural History Museum, London.

In 1988 J. S. Dugdale, in his catalogue of New Zealand Lepidoptera, placed this species within the Aletia genus. In 2019 Robert Hoare undertook a major review of New Zealand Noctuidae. During this review the genus Ichneutica was greatly expanded and the genus Aletia was subsumed into that genus as a synonym. As a result of this review, this species is now known as Ichneutica sistens. Hoare, while undertaking the review, inspected the type material of several species, originally named Agrotis mitis, Spaelotis inconstans, Aletia munda, Aletia gourlayi, Melanchra cyanopetra and Aletia lacustris. Hoare placed them all within the genus Ichneutica and subsumed them as synonyms of Ichneutica sistens. Hoare justifies this by arguing that although there are differences in size and wing pattern as well as minor variations in the genitalia of the male moths, these variations are in a continuous series.

Description 

S. Lindsay described the larvae of this species as follows:

Guenée describes the adults of this species as follows:
This species is variable in both size and colour. I. sistens has a forewing that is coloured grey or dark grey or a grey with a greenish tinge. The wingspan of the adult male is between 28 an 39 mm where as the female has a wingspan of between 29 and 39 mm. It can be distinguished from I. virescens as I. sistens is smaller, has a shorter and thicker forewing, with the outer edge being more rounded, and with less of a shine to the colour.

Distribution 
I. sistens is endemic to New Zealand. It is found in the central North Island and throughout the South Island, although more frequently on the eastern side of that Island.

Habitat 
This species prefers open habitats such as tussock grasslands, dunes and braided rivers.

Behaviour 
Adults of I. sistens are on the wing from January to May, though there are some specimens in the New Zealand Arthropod Collection that were collected in Central Otago in September. Adults of this species are attracted to light.

Life cycle and host species 

The larvae of this species feed on grasses in the family Poaceae including grasses in the genera Rytidosperma and Elymus, and species including Poa cita and Agrostis capillaris. Adults of the species have been observed feeding on Dracophyllum flowers.

References

Moths of New Zealand
Hadeninae
Endemic fauna of New Zealand
Moths described in 1868
Taxa named by Achille Guenée
Endemic moths of New Zealand